Marion Coakley (September 22, 1896 - August 30, 1968) was an actress on stage and screen.

She was in various theatrical productions from 1917 into the later 1920s.

The New York Public Library has a collection of photographs of her from White Studio. The Library of Congress has a glass negative photo of her.

Theater
An American Ace
The Meanest Man in the World
Cappy
The Mountain Man (1922)
The Werewolf (1924)
The Racket (1927)

Filmography
The Lost Battalion (1919)
The Enchanted Cottage (1924 film)

References

1896 births
1968 deaths